Terry Allvord is an American sports industry executive. He was in the U.S. Navy, where he rose to the rank of lieutenant commander.

Naval career
Allvord graduated from Canyon High School in California. He was a flight student at the Naval Air Station in Pensacola, Florida. 

When he retired he became an executive of the Nocona Athletic Goods Company and of Boston Baseball All-Stars, which owned the short-lived American Defenders of New Hampshire team.

Sports

Allvord founded the National Search and Rescue Competition for search-and-rescue professionals from all parts of the world. 

In 1990, while an ensign at the Naval Air Station, Allvord started the U.S. Navy Baseball Club, also known as the Southwestern Baseball League, following a visit by President George H. W. Bush to the National Museum of Naval Aviation in Pensacola. He later started more than forty military teams, the U.S. Military All-Stars, and the Red, White and Blue Tour3. He was a baseball coach at the Naval Academy Preparatory School in Newport, Rhode Island.

Honors
In 2003, he was selected as a Veterans Advantage Hero Vet.

Publications
 as "Crash Allvord": Heroes of the Diamond. Mascot Books (2011)

References

1964 births
Living people
Baseball executives
People from Santa Monica, California
Southern Illinois University alumni